Oleggio Magic Basket is a basketball team in Oleggio, Italy. Currently, the team baskets in the Serie B Basket, the third tier competition in basket. Founded in 1973 as AS Oleggio Basket, the club has played in the lower Italian regions for years.

References

Basketball teams in Piedmont
Oleggio